The Xiangde Temple is a temple in Xiulin Township, Hualien County, Taiwan.

History
After the opening of Central Cross-Island Highway, the main temple was completed in December 1968. The Daxiong Boudian, Tianfeng Pagoda and the White Robed Guanyin were then successively built.

Architecture
The temple resembles the shape of lotus surrounded by mountains around it.

See also
 Buddhism in Taiwan
 Religion in Taiwan
 List of temples in Taiwan

References

1968 establishments in Taiwan
Buddhist temples in Taiwan
Buildings and structures in Hualien County
Religious buildings and structures completed in 1968